Corrido is a folk poetic narrative and music genre of Mexico.

Corrido may also refer to:

Corrido, Lombardy, geographical area of Italy
Corrido (Spain), folk dance and music of Spain
Corrido (song), song form of Capoeira music